John Gillies (1792–1834) was a Scottish naval surgeon who later became an explorer and botanist, travelling extensively in South America.  Educated at the University of Edinburgh, he served in the Royal Navy during the Napoleonic Wars. Afflicted by tuberculosis, Gillies left the UK aged 28 for South America in the hope that the climate would improve his fragile health. He spent eight years there, mostly in Argentina, surviving wars, civil unrest, and chronic ill health, sending numerous plants to Hooker at the Royal Botanic Gardens Kew before returning in 1828. He died aged 42 at Edinburgh on 24 November 1834, his remains interred at Calton.

Eponymy

A number of plants were named for Gillies:
 (Amaryllidaceae) Gilliesia Lindl.
 (Acanthaceae) Adhatoda gilliesii Nees
 (Acanthaceae) Poikilacanthus gilliesii (Nees) Lindau
 (Pteridaceae) Notholaena gilliesii Fée
 (Anacardiaceae) Lithraea gilliesii Griseb. 
 (Asclepiadaceae) Oxystelma gilliesii K.Schum.
 (Asteraceae) Taraxacum gilliessi Hook. & Arn.
 (Blechnaceae) Orthogramma gilliesii C.Presl 
 (Bromeliaceae) Dyckia gilliesii Baker
 (Caesalpiniaceae) Caesalpinia gilliesii (Wall. ex Hook.) Benth.

References

1792 births
1834 deaths
Botanists with author abbreviations
Alumni of the University of Edinburgh
Scottish surgeons
Scottish sailors
Scottish explorers
Scottish botanists
19th-century British botanists
19th-century Scottish people
19th-century explorers
Explorers of South America
Royal Navy personnel of the Napoleonic Wars
Burials at Old Calton Burial Ground
Scientists from Edinburgh
People from Orkney
Royal Navy Medical Service officers